The rare mineral adelite, is a calcium, magnesium, arsenate with chemical formula CaMgAsO4OH. It forms a solid solution series with the vanadium-bearing mineral gottlobite. Various transition metals substitute for magnesium and lead replaces calcium leading to a variety of similar minerals in the adelite - duftite group.

Adelite forms variably colored (blue, green, yellow and grey) crystals in the orthorhombic crystal system. The form is typically massive. It has a Mohs hardness rating of 5 and a specific gravity of 3.73 to 3.79.

It was first described in 1891 from Värmland, Sweden. Its name comes from the Greek word for indistinct.

Geologic occurrence
Adelite has been found in ore deposits in Algeria, Germany, Italy, Sweden and the USA.

See also
Descloizite
List of minerals

References

Mindat.org
Webmineral data

Bibliography
Palache, P.; Berman H.; Frondel, C. (1960). "Dana's System of Mineralogy, Volume II: Halides, Nitrates, Borates, Carbonates, Sulfates, Phosphates, Arsenates, Tungstates, Molybdates, Etc. (Seventh Edition)" John Wiley and Sons, Inc., New York, pp. 804-806.

Arsenate minerals
Calcium minerals
Magnesium minerals
Orthorhombic minerals
Minerals in space group 19